Vasco Fernando Leote de Almeida e Costa, GCIH, GCL (24 July 1932 – 26 July 2010) was a Portuguese naval officer and politician.

Biography
He served as Minister of Internal Administration during José Pinheiro de Azevedo's government, between 19 September 1975 and 23 July 1976. He also had an important role during the Portuguese decolonization period. From 23 June 1976 he became interim Prime Minister after Pinheiro de Azevedo suffered a heart attack during his presidential campaign. He remained the 106th Prime Minister of Portugal as an interim official for the rest of Pinheiro de Azevedo's mandate, when he was substituted by the democratically elected Mário Soares. He was also the 134th Governor of Macau from 16 June 1981 to 15 May 1986. His reign in the colony was marked by considerable infrastructure development. Costa's decision to dissolve the local Legislative Assembly amid intensified power struggle with the local Macanese community was a major political crisis at that time. To balance the predominant Macanese legislature, he proposed electoral reform that empowered the Chinese business community and elites.  During his tenure, Costa twice threatened to pull out of Macao unilaterally amid tense debate on the year of  Handover.  

He was the son of Américo de Almeida e Costa and wife Julieta da Conceição Leote and married in Viana do Castelo, Meadela, at the Chapel of São Vicente, on 11 January 1959 to Maria Claudiana da Costa de Faria Araújo (b. Viana do Castelo, Meadela, House of o Ameal, 17 May 1934), one of the fourteen children of a couple of Northern Portuguese Nobility, and by whom he had issue.

He died just after his 78th birthday and was cremated 1 week later.

References

|-

1932 births
2010 deaths
People from Lisbon
Prime Ministers of Portugal
Governors of Macau